This is a list of rivers in Zambia. This list is arranged by drainage basin, with respective tributaries indented under each larger stream's name.

Atlantic Ocean 
Lake Tanganyika
Lufubu River
Kalambo River
Luvua River (Democratic Republic of the Congo)
Kalungwishi River
Luangwa River
Luapula River
Mbereshi River
Luongo River
Lwela River
Luombwa River
Chambeshi River
Lukulu River
Lwombe River

Indian Ocean
Zambezi River
Luia River (Mozambique)
Capoche River
Luangwa River
Lunsemfwa River
Lukasashi River
Mulungushi River
Lupande River
Lundazi River
Chongwe River
Kafue River
Lufupa River
Lunga River
Luswishi River
Kalomo River
Machili River
Cuando River
Njoko River
Lumbe River
Lui River
Luete River
Luanginga River
Luena River
Lungwebungu River
Kabompo River
Dongwe River
Lalafuta River
Musondweji River
Maninga River
West Lunga River
Mwafwe River
Sakeji River

Lake Rukwa
Momba River (Tanzania)
Saisi River
Lumi River

See also
Water transport in Zambia

References
Prentice-Hall, Inc., American World Atlas 1985
United Nations 2004
GEOnet Names Server

Zambia
Rivers